Grantsville may refer to the following places in the U.S.:

Grantsville, Maryland
Grantsville, Missouri
Grantsville Township, Linn County, Missouri
Grantsville Formation, a geologic formation in Nevada
Grantsville, Utah
Grantsville National Forest
Grantsville, West Virginia

See also

Grantville (disambiguation)